Humberto Salvador Mercado-Luján (born 25 March 1969) is a retired Mexican football midfielder who played professionally in Mexico and the United States.

Mercado began his professional career with Cobras de Ciudad Juárez. His first match was on 10 March 1991. In the summer of 1994, Mercado spent the Mexican off-season with the El Paso Patriots of the USISL. In 1994, he moved to Atlético Celaya. In 1995, he went on loan to El Paso which finished runner-up to the Richmond Kickers in the 1995 U.S. Open Cup final.  In 1996, he again spent the summer with the Patriots. In the winter of 1996, Mercado signed with C.D. Guadalajara. He was out for most of the season due to an injury, but played a handful of games as the Chivas won the Torneo Verano. He then transferred to Tiburones Rojos de Veracruz. After missing the 1998 summer season with the Patriots, Mercado returned to El Paso in 1999. In 2000, Mercado began the season with Atlético Celaya, but finished it with Ciudad Juarez. In 2001 and 2004, he again spent the summers with the Patriots. In 2001, they played in the USL A-League but by 2004, they were in the USL Premier Development League. In 2007, he coached the Patriots.

References

Living people
1969 births
American soccer players
American Indoor Soccer Association players
C.D. Guadalajara footballers
Atlético Celaya footballers
El Paso Patriots players
Mexican football managers
Mexican expatriate footballers
Mexican footballers
USISL players
USL Second Division players
USISL Select League players
USL League Two players
A-League (1995–2004) players
Footballers from Mexico City
Association football midfielders